Hakanen is a Finnish surname. Notable people with the surname include:

 Reijo Hakanen (born 1943), Finnish ice hockey player
 Ernest A. Hakanen (born 1958), social theorist
 Tapio Hakanen (born 1977), Finnish musician known by his stage name DJ Orkidea

Finnish-language surnames